Matthew "Matt" William Short (born 8 November 1995) is an Australian cricketer. He represents Victoria at state level and plays for the Adelaide Strikers in the Big Bash League (BBL). He previously played for the Melbourne Renegades.

Short made his one day debut on 20 July 2014 for the Australia National Performance Squad against South Africa A, as part of the Australia A Team Quadrangular Series in 2014. He made his first-class debut for Cricket Australia XI on 29 October 2015 in a tour match against the New Zealanders as part of New Zealand's tour to Australia. He scored his maiden first-class century playing for Cricket Australia XI in a tour match against England at Townsville in mid-November 2017, scoring 51 in the first innings and then 134 not out in the second. He also took 4/103 with the ball.

For the 2021/22 BBL season (BBL11), Short moved from the middle order to open the batting, finishing the season with the second most sixes (26) and third-most runs (493). Strikers captain Peter Siddle said of the move: "Last year was all about finding a position for him because he’s been thrown around for a few years and hasn’t been able to lock down a spot ... We found that spot for him last year and he got all the confidence from being at the top of the order. He’s fearless and we saw that against the Sixers."

On 5 January 2023, captaining the Strikers in Peter Siddle's absence, Short made his maiden century in the Big Bash League, scoring 100* from 59 balls in the highest run chase in BBL history (230 runs). Bowling himself for 4 overs, he also had figures of 1/34. On 30 January 2023, Short was named BBL12 Player of the Tournament at the Australian Cricket Awards.

References

External links

Living people
1995 births
Cricketers from Victoria (Australia)
Cricket Australia XI cricketers
Melbourne Renegades cricketers
Victoria cricketers
Adelaide Strikers cricketers
Australian cricketers